Sophie Chang and Alexandra Mueller were the defending champions, but lost in the semifinals to Vladica Babić and Caitlin Whoriskey.

Anna Danilina and Ingrid Neel, won the title, defeating Babić and Whoriskey in the final, 6–1, 6–1.

Seeds

Draw

Draw

References
Main Draw

LTP Charleston Pro Tennis II - Doubles
LTP Charleston Pro Tennis